The Electronika 60 is a computer made in the Soviet Union by Elektronika in Voronezh from 1978 until 1991. It is a rack-mounted system with no built-in display or storage devices.  It was usually paired with a 15IE-00-013 terminal and I/O devices. The main logic unit is located on the M2 CPU board.

The original implementation of Tetris was written for the Electronika 60 by Alexey Pajitnov in 1984. As the Electronika 60 does not have raster graphics, text was used to form the blocks.

Technical specifications
M2 CPU:
 LSI-11 (PDP-11 LSI CPU implementation) clone
 Word length: 16 bits
 Address space: 32K words (64 KB)
 RAM size: 4K words (8 KB)
 Number of instructions: 81
 Floating-point capacity: 32 bits
 Number of VLSI chips: 5
 Board dimensions: 240 × 280 mm

References

External links
 Article about Electronika-60 in Russian
 Images of the Electronika 60M
 Archive software and documentation for Soviet computers UK-NC, DVK and BK0010

PDP-11
Ministry of the Electronics Industry (Soviet Union) computers